Mathieu Faivre (born 18 January 1992) is a French World Cup alpine ski racer, and specializes in giant slalom. He has competed for France in two Winter Olympics and six World Championships. In 2021, he won two gold medals for world titles in giant slalom and parallel giant slalom.

Career
Born in Nice, Alpes-Maritimes, Faivre made his World Cup debut at age 18 in March 2010 and gained his first World Cup podium in February 2016 in a giant slalom at Naeba, Japan. Faivre's second podium came a month later at the World Cup finals in St. Moritz, Switzerland, part of an all-French podium, having led after the first run for the first time in his career. He ended the season at a career-high position of fourth in the final giant slalom standings. Faivre's first World Cup victory came on home country snow in December 2016  

Despite not being a big favorite entering the 2021 World Championships in Cortina d'Ampezzo, Italy, Faivre won two gold medals. He took the inaugural parallel giant slalom, and the giant slalom three days later, where he was in fourth place after the first run, more than a half-second back. To date, these two world titles are his standout racing achievements. A week later, he gained his second World Cup win at Bansko, Bulgaria, after a runner-up finish the day before.

Faivre represented France in the Giant Slalom at the 2022 Winter Olympics. He finished his first run in third position and, despite falling behind Žan Kranjec on his second run, maintained his position to take the bronze medal after a mistake from Stefan Brennsteiner.

Personal life

Faivre was in a relationship with Olympic and World Cup champion Mikaela Shiffrin beginning in the summer of 2017, but it ended in 2019.

World Cup results

Season standings

Race podiums
 2 wins – (2 GS)
 10 podiums – (10 GS); 43 top tens

World Championships results

Olympic results

References

External links

French Ski Team – 2023 men's A team 

  

1992 births
Living people
Olympic alpine skiers of France
Alpine skiers at the 2014 Winter Olympics
Alpine skiers at the 2018 Winter Olympics
Alpine skiers at the 2022 Winter Olympics
Medalists at the 2022 Winter Olympics
Olympic bronze medalists for France
Olympic medalists in alpine skiing
French male alpine skiers
Sportspeople from Nice
21st-century French people